Gap Year is a British comedy-drama series that premiered on E4 on 23 February 2017. It follows the adventures of a group of backpackers taking a trip through Asia. The series was created by Tom Basden, Jamie Campbell and Joel Wilson, and stars Ade Oyefeso, Anders Hayward, Tim Key, Alice Lee and Brittney Wilson. After eight episodes, the series concluded on 13 April 2017. In September 2017, the network decided not to renew the show for a second series.

Premise
Gap Year begins with best mates Dylan (Anders Hayward) and Sean (Ade Oyefeso) who set out to backpack through China after Dylan's split from girlfriend Lauren (Rachel Redford), but they end up travelling the whole continent of Asia after meeting Ashley (Brittney Wilson), Greg (Tim Key) and May (Alice Lee).

Cast and characters

Main
 Ade Oyefeso as Sean, who quit his plumbing job to go on a trip to China with his best friend, Dylan.
 Anders Hayward as Dylan, a University student who is trying to get over his ex-girlfriend Lauren.
 Tim Key as Greg, an older wannabe businessman attempting to prove his ex-partner, Daisy, wrong. Greg joined May and Ashley after they shared a raft to cut costs. 
 Alice Lee as May, who visits China to meet her mother's family, accompanied by near-stranger Ashley at her mother's insistence of her not going alone.
 Brittney Wilson as Ashley, whose university scholarship is in jeopardy, accompanies May in spite of them not knowing each other well prior to the trip.

Recurring / Guest stars
 Janeane Garofalo as Sam, a travel advisor whom Sean and Dylan meet on the flight to China.
 Aisling Bea and Trystan Gravelle as Kendra and Eugene, a married couple traveling through China.
 Rachel Redford as Lauren, Dylan's ex-girlfriend.
 Jamie Demetriou as Norm, current boyfriend of Lauren.
 Scott Adsit as Todd, who runs the Vietnam orphanage.
 Amelia Dowd as Dana, a novice stand-in tour guide in Malaysia who falls in love with Sean.
 Camille Chamoux as Genevieve, French backpacker with cancer who befriends Ashley in Malaysia.
 Daniel Rigby as Jotty, long time friend of Greg, now a successful businessman in Kuala Lumpur.
 Robert Bathurst as Bertie, friend of Jotty.
 Kelly Hu as Vanessa, May's mother.

Episodes

Sources:Channel 4IMDb

Broadcast
It was shown on E4 in the UK for original release. Internationally, it was broadcast on Super Channel in Canada from 14 September 2017. The series is also accessible on Hulu.

References

External links
 
 
 

2010s British comedy-drama television series
2010s British satirical television series
2017 British television series debuts
2017 British television series endings
E4 dramas
E4 sitcoms
English-language television shows
Television series about vacationing
Television series by Entertainment One
Television series by Sony Pictures Television
Television shows set in China
Television shows set in Malaysia
Television shows set in Nepal
Television shows set in Thailand
Television shows set in Vietnam